is a fictional dinosaur, or kaiju, who first appeared in Toho's 1967 film King Kong Escapes. It was an opponent of King Kong in the film, and it later had a prominent role in 1968's Destroy All Monsters. Gorosaurus is a typical giant dinosaur, having no special powers like beams or energy weapons, relying on its strength and athleticism to fight. Gorosaurus' most identifiable fighting move is a leaping kick similar to that of a kangaroo. Gorosaurus is an allosaurid, an abrupt descendant of Allosaurus itself.

Overview
In the film King Kong Escapes, Mondo Island inhabitant Gorosaurus attacks and attempts to devour Susan Watson. However, King Kong arrives to save her and fights the dinosaur, breaking Gorosaurus' jaw in the process.

Gorosaurus returns in the film Destroy All Monsters, as an inhabitant of Monsterland, an artificially created environment for Earth's monsters located on the Ogasawara Islands. However, a race of aliens called the Kilaaks invade Earth, capturing and brainwashing the monsters before sending them around the world to attack Earth's cities, with Gorosaurus attacking Paris, France, before being recalled to defend their Earth outpost. After a group of humans destroy the Kilaaks' control device, the aliens send King Ghidorah to kill the Earth monsters, who join forces to kill the space dragon. Following this, Earth's monsters return to Monsterland to live in peace.

Appearances

Films
 King Kong Escapes (1967)
 Destroy All Monsters (1968)
 All Monsters Attack (1969, stock footage cameo)
 Godzilla vs. Gigan (1972, stock footage cameo)

Television
 Ike! Godman (1972)
 Godzilla Island (1997-1998)

Video games
 Kaijū-ō Godzilla / King of the Monsters, Godzilla (Game Boy - 1993)
 Godzilla Trading Battle (PlayStation - 1998)
 Godzilla Defense Force (2019)

Literature
 Godzilla: Rulers of Earth (comic - 2013-2015)
 Godzilla: Monster Apocalypse (novel - 2017)
 Godzilla: Project Mechagodzilla (novel - 2018)

References

Fantasy film characters
Film characters introduced in 1967
Fictional dinosaurs
Fictional giants
Fictional monsters
Godzilla characters
Horror film villains
Kaiju
King Kong (franchise) characters
Science fiction film characters
Toho monsters